Óscar Eduardo Villa Domínguez (born 24 February 2001) is a Mexican professional footballer who plays as a full-back for Liga MX club León.

Career statistics

Club

Honours
León
Leagues Cup: 2021

References

External links
 
 
 

Living people
2001 births
Mexican footballers
Mexico youth international footballers
Association football defenders
Club León footballers
Liga MX players
Footballers from Veracruz
People from Pánuco, Veracruz